was a women's football team which played in Division 1 of Japan's Nadeshiko League. It founded the league back in 1994. The club was disbanded in 1998.

Honors

Domestic competitions
Nadeshiko.League Division 1
Champions (3) : 1996, 1997, 1998
Runners-up (1) : 1995
Empress's Cup All-Japan Women's Football Tournament
Champions (3) : 1990, 1992, 1996
Runners-up (2) : 1994, 1998

Results

External links 

Japanese women's club teams

Women's football clubs in Japan
1976 establishments in Japan
Sports teams in Chiba Prefecture